Kevin is a common male first name of the Irish origin.

Kevin may also refer to:

Kevinism, the tendency of parents in German-speaking areas to name their children with what appears to them to be unusual, exotic-sounding first names
Kevin, Montana, a town in the United States
Kevin ZP98, a semi-automatic subcompact pistol manufactured in the Czech Republic
"Kevin (Skit)", a song from ADHD (Joyner Lucas album), 2000
A giant bird in Disney's Up (2009 film)

See also
We Need to Talk About Kevin, winner of the 2003 Orange Prize for fiction
Kevon